What a Girl (German:So ein Mädel) is a 1920 German silent film directed by Urban Gad and starring Hella Moja and Harry Liedtke and Ferry Sikla.

Cast
 Hella Moja
 Harry Liedtke 
 Ferry Sikla 
 Hermann Picha 
 Ada Sorel 
 Erner Huebsch 
 Frida Richard 
 Adolf Suchanek
 Georgine Sobjeska 
 Karl Harbacher 
 Max Maximilian
 Eva Sorel

References

Bibliography
 Jill Nelmes & Jule Selbo. Women Screenwriters: An International Guide. Palgrave Macmillan, 2015.

External links

1920 films
Films of the Weimar Republic
Films directed by Urban Gad
German silent feature films
German black-and-white films